Mesopotamocnus is an extinct genus of megalonychid ground sloth that lived during the Late Miocene in what is now Argentina. Fossils have been found in the Ituzaingó Formation of Argentina.

Etymology 
The generic name, Mesopotamocnus, is derived from "Mesopotam", from its geographic provenance, Mesopotamia, which in turn means "between rivers" in Greek, and -ocnus, meaning "lazy" or "slow" which is commonly used to name extinct sloths. The specific name, brevirostrum, means "short snout".

Taxonomy 
Mesopotamocnus (as "Ortotherium" brevirostrum") was originally assigned to the Nothrotheriidae however, the genus Ortotherium is currently considered to be a megalonychid, without being assigned to a particular clade such as Ortotheriinae, Megalocninae or Megalonychinae. Furthermore most of the genera and species that were traditionally considered nothrotheres are now considered members of the Nothrotheriinae, such as Nothrotherium,  Nothropus, Pronothrotherium, Nothrotheriops, and Mionothropus, or as basal Megatherioidea such as Hapalops, Schismotherium, and Pelecyodon.

References 

Prehistoric sloths
Prehistoric placental genera
Miocene xenarthrans
Miocene mammals of South America
Neogene Argentina
Fossils of Argentina
Huayquerian
Ituzaingó Formation
Fossil taxa described in 2014